The 2019 Rally Sweden (also known as the Rally Sweden 2019) was a motor racing event for rally cars that was held over four days between 14 and 17 February 2019. It marked the sixty-seventh running of Rally Sweden and was the second round of the 2019 World Rally Championship. It was also the second round of the World Rally Championship-2 and the newly created WRC-2 Pro class, and the first round of the Junior World Rally Championship. The 2019 event was based in the town of Torsby in Värmland County and consists of nineteen special stages.

Thierry Neuville and Nicolas Gilsoul were the defending rally winners. Their team, Hyundai Shell Mobis WRT, were the defending manufacturers' winners. Takamoto Katsuta and Marko Salminen were the defending winners in the World Rally Championship-2 category. Denis Rådström and Johan Johansson were the reigning World Rally Championship-3 and defending Junior World Rally Championship winners, but didn't defend their WRC-3 title as the category was discontinued in 2019.

Ott Tänak and Martin Järveoja became the fourth non-Nordic crew to win the event. Their team, Toyota Gazoo Racing WRT, were the manufacturers' winners. The Citroën Total crew of Mads Østberg and Torstein Eriksen took the victory in the WRC-2 Pro category, while Ole Christian Veiby and Jonas Andersson won the wider WRC-2 class, finishing first in the combined WRC-2 category. This marked the first R5 class victory in the WRC for the new Volkswagen Polo GTI R5. The first round of the J-WRC championship was taken by Tom Kristensson and Henrik Appelskog crew in their maiden appearances.

Jari-Matti Latvala surpassed the record for most starts in the history of the World Rally Championship with his 197th start. The previous record was set by Carlos Sainz, with 196 starts.

Background

Championship standings prior to the event
Defending world champions Sébastien Ogier and Julien Ingrassia entered the round with an eight-point lead over the defending rally winners Thierry Neuville and Nicolas Gilsoul. Ott Tänak and Martin Järveoja were third, a further four points behind. In the World Rally Championship for Manufacturers, Hyundai Shell Mobis WRT held a five-point lead over Citroën World Rally Team and the defending manufacturers' champions Toyota Gazoo Racing WRT.

In the newly created World Rally Championship-2 Pro standings, Gus Greensmith and Elliott Edmondson held a seven-point lead ahead of Kalle Rovanperä and Jonne Halttunen in the drivers' and co-drivers' standings respectively. In the teams' championship, M-Sport Ford WRT led Škoda Motorsport by seven points.

In the World Rally Championship-2 standings, Yoann Bonato and Benjamin Boulloud led the drivers' and co-drivers' standings by seven points respectively. Adrien Fourmaux and Renaud Jamoul were second, with Ole Christian Veiby and Jonas Andersson in third in each standings, another slender three points behind.

Entry list
The following crews were entered into the rally. The event was open to crews competing in the World Rally Championship, World Rally Championship-2 and WRC-2 Pro, the Junior World Rally Championship, and privateer entries not registered to score points in any championship. A total of sixty-two entries were received, with fourteen crews entered with World Rally Cars and twenty-three entered the World Rally Championship-2; of these, five were nominated to score points in the Pro class. A further thirteen entries were received for the Junior World Rally Championship.

Route
The Rämmen stage will return replace the Torntorp stage. Rämmen is due to be run as SS9 and SS12 and will run in the opposite direction to previous years.

Itinerary

All dates and times are CET (UTC+1).

Report

World Rally Cars
Being first on the road meant Sébastien Ogier and Julien Ingrassia have to endure changeable conditions and unpredictable grip. As it turned out, it is highly risky. The six-time World Champions went off the road on Svullrya and stuck in the snowbank, which forced them to retire from the first leg. The other major victim was Jari-Matti Latvala and Miikka Anttila crew, who went wide over a crest on the final stage of Friday and cost them nearly twenty-four minutes to get unstuck. They chose to run under Rally2 regulation so that they reduced the time loss to ten minutes.

The second leg of the rally appeared to be a total disaster for Teemu Suninen and Marko Salminen. Having led a rally for the first time ever, they beached their Fiesta at a left-hand corner, which dropped them down to eighth. Worse still, at the afternoon loop, they hit a tree and damaged their roll cage, which forced them to retire from the day. Following the retirement of Suninen and Salminen, Ott Tänak and Martin Järveoja were comfortable in the lead.

Eventually, The Estonian crew comfortably took their first snow-surfaced rally victory. With the win, they led in both the drivers' and co-drivers' standings for the first time ever in their career by seven points. Their team, defending manufacturers' champions Toyota Gazoo Racing WRT also led the championship by one point. Esapekka Lappi and Janne Ferm crew managed to keep themselves ahead of Thierry Neuville and Nicolas Gilsoul with just a three seconds of advantage.

Classification

Special stages

Championship standings

World Rally Championship-2 Pro

Classification

Special stages
Results in bold denote first in the RC2 class, the class which both the WRC-2 Pro and WRC-2 championships run to.

Championship standings

World Rally Championship-2

Classification

Special stages
Results in bold denote first in the RC2 class, the class which both the WRC-2 Pro and WRC-2 championships run to.

Championship standings

Junior World Rally Championship

Classification

Special stages

Championship standings

Notes

References

External links

  
 2019 Rally Sweden in e-wrc website
 The official website of the World Rally Championship

Sweden
2019 in Swedish motorsport
February 2019 sports events in Sweden
2019